The Scottish Futures Trust (SFT) is an executive non-departmental public body of the Scottish Government, established in September 2008 to improve public infrastructure investment. SFT operates at arm's length from the Government but works closely with the public and private sectors to deliver value-for-money on all public sector infrastructure investment across the country. The trust has the aim of saving £100–£150 million each year through a wide range of activities.

Background
In their manifesto for the 2007 election, the Scottish National Party (SNP) proposed the Scottish Futures Trust as an alternative to PPP/PFI, encouraging greater use of public bonds, to access to lower-cost borrowing. It was a solution conceived to allow the devolved administration to gain some leverage around private sector investment.

Structure
 the trust has a £4million operating budget. There are a team of over 50 professionals at SFT, who have the responsibility of increasing the efficiency and effectiveness of infrastructure investment in Scotland.  It is run by a board of seven members appointed by Scottish ministers, headed by non-executive chairman Sir Angus Grossart.

Programme
The programme of work includes plans for 1000 homes, with work having begun on 600 of these by mid-2012. Healthcare projects that have been achieved through the SFT include the £15m Aberdeen Community Health and Care Village which opened in 2013 and the new £150m Royal Hospital for Sick Children and Department of Clinical Neurosciences in Edinburgh which is due to open in 2017. The schedule includes a £1.25billion schools programme.

Reported savings
During 2009−10, SFT reported saving the Scottish taxpayer £111 million, which increased to £129 million in 2010–11.

In 2011−2012, SFT reported helping to deliver £131 million of net benefits and savings to infrastructure investment with their calculations independently validated by Grant Thornton LLP and academics from the London School of Economics and Political Science. And in 2012/13, the benefits figure reached £132 million, bringing SFT's cumulative benefits to over £500 million.

When SFT was established in 2008, Scottish Ministers set it a challenging target of achieving between £100 - £150m of savings and benefits each year during its first, five-year Corporate Plan period.

SFT succeeded, as between 2009 and 2014, it secured £642m of savings and benefits.

During this 2014 – 2019 Corporate Plan period, SFT is working to secure a similar amount and is on track to do so with £135m delivered in 2014/15, £146m in 2015/16 and £138m in 2016/17.

Over and above its financial target, the impact of SFT's work generates many benefits that make a difference to peoples' lives, as it secures future employment; it creates new training and apprenticeship opportunities; it helps protect the environment; it expands access to superfast broadband, and it improves working environments by having flexible, well-designed buildings.

See also
Public–private partnership

References

External links

2008 establishments in Scotland
Companies based in Edinburgh
British companies established in 2008
Government agencies established in 2008
Infrastructure in Scotland
Executive non-departmental public bodies of the Scottish Government
Public finance of Scotland
Public–private partnership units